Naso tuberosus is a tropical fish found in coral reefs in the central Pacific and Indian Oceans. It is commonly known as the humpnose unicornfish. It feeds primarily on Caulerpa species of green algae.

References

Naso (fish)
Fish described in 1801